Saratu Gidado, popularly known as Daso (born 17 January 1968), is a Nigerian film actress, primarily in the Kannywood film industry. She is known for the role she always plays as an aggressive and mischievous actress who defied all odds to rise to stardom. She made her film debut in 2000 in Linzami Da Wuta, produced by Sarauniya Movies. Other hits such as Nagari, Gidauniya, Mashi, and Sansani followed. she affirm that she like playing the role of a wicked woman.

Early life and career
Saratu Gidado was born in Gombe State northern Nigeria, she attended her primary school at Kano state, she was the first married woman in the kannywood industry .

aside from acting,Gidado was assigned as the protocol officer (Jakadiya)to emire of Kano state Muhammad Sanusi II in the year 2016 Primum News

Filmography
Saratu Gidado joined the Kannywood film industry in 2000 and has appeared in over 100 movies.

See also
 List of Kannywood actors

References

Nigerian film actresses
Hausa-language mass media
Actresses in Hausa cinema
21st-century Nigerian actresses
Hausa people
1968 births
Living people
People from Kano State
Kannywood actors